Parhippopsicon is a genus of beetles in the family Cerambycidae, containing the following species:

 Parhippopsicon albicans Breuning, 1942
 Parhippopsicon albosuturale Breuning, 1971
 Parhippopsicon albovittatum Breuning, 1978
 Parhippopsicon clarkei Breuning, 1976
 Parhippopsicon flavicans Breuning, 1970
 Parhippopsicon vittipenne Breuning, 1970

References

Agapanthiini